Euriphene hecqui is a butterfly in the family Nymphalidae. It is found in southern Cameroon, the Democratic Republic of the Congo (Équateur) and the Central African Republic.

References

Butterflies described in 1997
Euriphene